Wilfrid Paiement, Jr. (born October 16, 1955) is a Canadian former professional ice hockey right wing who played in the National Hockey League (NHL) from 1974 through 1988, for seven different NHL teams. He is the younger brother of former NHL hockey player Rosaire Paiement.

Playing career
Wilf Paiement was selected in the first round (2nd overall) of the 1974 NHL amateur draft by the Kansas City Scouts. He played two seasons in Kansas City before the team moved to Colorado and became the Colorado Rockies.

Paiement was a member of the Canadian team that returned to the World Championship in Austria in 1977 after seven years of absence. During the tournament, frustrated by the lack of success, many members of Team Canada, including Paiement, resorted to violence. Paiement attacked Swedish player Lars-Erik Ericsson (who received a stick in the eye), as well as Russian players Shadrin, Yakushev and Babinov (who were all knocked unconscious).

On October 25, 1978, Paiement attacked Detroit Red Wings centre Dennis Polonich with his stick. The diminutive five-foot-six-inch Polonich was trash-talking with Paiement, when Paiement struck Polonich's across the face with a two-handed slash, which resulted in severe facial lacerations, a smashed nose that required extensive reconstructive surgery, and a severe concussion. Along with a match penalty, Paiement was given the second longest (at the time) suspension in NHL history - 15 games. Polonich sued, and was rewarded with a settlement of $850,000 in 1982; he has suffered with breathing problems from then on.

Paiement was traded from the Rockies to the Toronto Maple Leafs along with Pat Hickey for Lanny McDonald and Joel Quenneville on December 29, 1979.

Paiement played in Toronto for the next three seasons before again being traded to the Quebec Nordiques for Miroslav Frycer and a 7th round pick in the 1982 NHL Entry Draft (Jeff Triano). After five seasons in Quebec, he was traded to the New York Rangers for Steve Patrick where he only played eight regular season games and 16 playoff games.

The Buffalo Sabres claimed Paiement off waivers on October 6, 1986. He only played one season in Buffalo before rounding out his career with the Pittsburgh Penguins and finally, the Muskegon Lumberjacks of the International Hockey League (IHL) in 1987–88. At the time of his retirement, he was the last active player who had played for the Kansas City Scouts.

Career statistics

Regular season and playoffs

International

Achievements
Wilf Paiement was the first player drafted by the Kansas City Scouts/Colorado Rockies/New Jersey Devils organization. He played in both the first games of the Scouts and the Rockies. Upon his retirement from the NHL, Paiement was the last active player to have played for the Scouts.

While Paiement was playing for the Toronto Maple Leafs he wore the number 99 for the 187 games he spent in Toronto, and was the last player other than Wayne Gretzky to wear that number, last wearing it on March 6, 1982 against the Montreal Canadiens. Referencing his time using the number 99, Paiement appeared in a commercial for the Canadian furniture store Leon's in 2008, in honour of their 99th anniversary. The commercial teased the appearance of Gretzky before revealing Paiement, who then said "What, you're expecting someone else?"

Awards
OMJHL First All-Star Team – 1974
WEC–A Best Forward – 1979 (Tied with Sergei Makarov)
NHL All–Star Team – 1976, 1977, 1978

Transactions 
July 15, 1976 – Transferred to Colorado after Kansas City franchise relocated.
December 29, 1979 – Traded to Toronto by Colorado with Pat Hickey for Lanny McDonald and Joel Quenneville.
March 9, 1982 – Traded to Quebec by Toronto for Miroslav Frycer and Quebec's 7th round choice (Jeff Triano) in 1982 Entry Draft.
February 6, 1986 – Traded to NY Rangers by Quebec for Steve Patrick.
October 6, 1986 – Claimed by Buffalo from NY Rangers in Waiver Draft.
September 10, 1987 – Signed as a free agent by Pittsburgh.

References

External links
 
 Wilf's Bio on Hockey Draft Central.com

1955 births
Buffalo Sabres players
Canadian ice hockey right wingers
Colorado Rockies (NHL) players
Franco-Ontarian people
Ice hockey people from Ontario
Kansas City Scouts draft picks
Kansas City Scouts players
Living people
Muskegon Lumberjacks players
National Hockey League first-round draft picks
New York Rangers players
Niagara Falls Flyers players
People from Timiskaming District
Pittsburgh Penguins players
Quebec Nordiques players
St. Catharines Black Hawks players
Toronto Maple Leafs players